The Yoruba are an ethnic group of West Africa:

"Yoruba" may refer to specific characteristics of the Yoruba people:
 Yoruba language
 Yoruba culture
 Yoruba religion
 Yoruba music
 Yorubaland, region occupied by the Yoruba people

It may also refer to:
 Yoruba (spider), a genus of ground spiders

See also

Language and nationality disambiguation pages